The South Eastern and Chatham Railway Companies Joint Management Committee (SE&CRCJMC), known as the South Eastern and Chatham Railway (SE&CR), was a working union of two neighbouring rival railways, the South Eastern Railway (SER) and London, Chatham and Dover Railway (LC&DR), which operated between London and south-east England. Between 1899 and 1923, the SE&CR had a monopoly of railway services in Kent and to the main Channel ports for ferries to France and Belgium.

The companies had competed extensively, with some of the bitterest conflicts between British railway companies. Competing routes to the same destinations were built, so several towns in Kent had been served with a similar frequency service by both companies. In places, unfettered competition allowed two stations and services to multiple London termini.

It would be a constituent of the Southern Railway as part of the 1923 Grouping.

Formation
By the end of the 19th century, the SER and LC&DR had fought over a small and not particularly lucrative territory for 40 years. Both were notorious for the poor punctuality of their services and the decrepitude of their rolling stock, and the struggles had driven both companies to the verge of bankruptcy. It became inevitable that they must combine or succumb.

The SE&CR was formed on 1 January 1899, when the SER and LC&DR formed a "management committee" comprising the directors of both companies. This merged the two companies' operations, although they remained legally separate, with receipts split 59% to SER and 41% LC&DR until the Grouping, to avoid the costs and risks of a formal merger.

Integration

The SE&CR began connecting the two networks and new services were introduced, reaping the benefits of joint working. A significant step was the construction of a junction in 1902-4 between the SER and LC&DR main lines where they crossed near Bickley and St Mary Cray, east of Bromley; the LC&DR's line via Maidstone to Ashford was connected to the SER station at Ashford; and the SER branch from Strood to Chatham alongside the LC&DR's main line to Chatham was closed prior to World War I.  The overlapping networks on the Isle of Thanet (Margate-Broadstairs-Ramsgate) were rationalised by the Southern Railway. Service cuts under BR saw Gravesend lose its second station.

Further development

After the formation of the SE&CR, three minor lines were built before the formation of the Southern Railway in 1923. They were:
Tattenham Corner branch - Kingswood to Tattenham Corner, in 1901.
The Sheppey Light Railway - branch off the Sheerness branch, in 1901 (closed 1950).
Bexhill branch - Crowhurst, on the Hastings Line, to Bexhill West, in 1902 (now closed).

Accidents and incidents

Three people were killed and twenty were injured.
On 6 December 1905, the roof of  station collapsed after a tie-rod snapped. Six people were killed and eight were injured.
Two people were killed and eleven were injured.
On 11 March 1913, a passenger train failed to stop at  station, Kent and crashed into a van, which was pushed through the buffers. The accident was caused by the failure to connect the brake pipe between the locomotive and its train. Ten people were injured.
One person was killed.

SE&CR locomotives 

The LC&DR's works at Longhedge, Battersea closed in 1911 and production was concentrated at Ashford.  Harry Wainwright was replaced by Richard Maunsell as Locomotive Superintendent in 1913.  
List of locomotives

Electrification

With the development and implementation of electrification by the L&SWR, the LB&SCR, the "Tube" companies and tram operators in the early twentieth century, the SE&CR planned to start electrifying its lines. The proposed method would have used four rails, with one of the two additional rails energised at +1500 V DC and the other at −1500 V DC. Current would have been collected by side-contact, with the conductor rails protected by wooden boarding on top and at the sides. Trains would have consisted of multiple-units, each including two motor coaches, each motor coach having two traction motors: one motor coach would have been supplied by the positive conductor rail, the other by the negative. This very high voltage for rail track level systems was used in Britain only on the L&YR's 1200 V DC side-contact third-rail line from Manchester Victoria to Bury. Grouping in 1923 led to the Southern Railway adopting the L&SWR's standard of 660 V DC third rail on the SE&CR's network.

Notable people 
 Harry Wainwright, Chief Mechanical Engineer 1899-1913
 Richard Maunsell, Chief Mechanical Engineer 1913-1923
 Alfred Weeks Szlumper, Engineering Assistant 1880–1882.

Ships
The SE&CR operated ships on cross-channel services.

Ex SER ships.

Ex LC&DR ships.

Ships built for the SE&CR.

Other ships operated by the SE&CR

References

Notes

Sources

A potted history of the SE&CR

External links

The South Eastern & Chatham Railway Society (SECSOC)

 
Railway companies of the United Kingdom
History of Kent
History of transport in London
Railway companies established in 1899
1899 establishments in England
British companies established in 1899